Fagge is a surname. Notable people with the surname include:

Charles Hilton Fagge (1838–1883), English physician
Charles Herbert Fagge (1873–1939), English surgeon
Frederick Fagge (1814–1884), English cricketer and priest
Sir John Fagge, 1st Baronet (1627–1701), English politician
Sir Robert Fagge, 2nd Baronet (c.1649–1715), English politician
Sir Robert Fagge, 3rd Baronet (1673–1736), English politician